Zoe Foo Yuk Han (born 16 September 1998) is a Malaysian female squash player. She reached the career best world ranking of 93 in June 2015. She was educated at the Bukit Jalil Sports School and George Washington University.

Foo has also competed at the Asian Junior Squash Individual Championships emerging as runners-up at the U15 division in 2012 and 2013. She also emerged as runners-up in the Girls U17 division Asian Junior Championships in 2014 and 2015 before making her international senior debut for Malaysian squash team. She resigned from the national team in 2017.

References 

1998 births
Living people
Malaysian female squash players
Sportspeople from Kuala Lumpur
George Washington University alumni
21st-century Malaysian women